Carcant is a small settlement and a wind farm, near Heriot in the Scottish Borders area of Scotland.

A famous inhabitant of Carcant was Eric Liddell.

Etymology

Carcant is etymologically a Cumbric place-name. The first element is cognate with Welsh caer 'fortification'. The second might be can 'white', in which case the name means 'white fort'; but more likely it is cant 'edge of a circle', in this context probably meaning 'district, region, edge, border', thus giving 'fort of the region/border'.

See also
Clan Borthwick
List of places in the Scottish Borders

References

External links

Renewables Map: Carcant, Heriot, Scottish Borders
Scottish Natural Heritage: Windfarms in Scotland (March 2010
RCAHMS record of Carcant
RCAHMS record of Carcant Windfarm
British Listed Buildings: Carcant Bridge over Carcant Burn
Eric Liddell Image Gallery

Villages in the Scottish Borders